Commander Charles K. Belknap Jr. (September 6, 1880 - December 29, 1954) was the commander of the USS Ammen (DD-35) in 1913. He was the censor for the United States Navy in 1917.

Biography
He was born on September 6, 1880, in Concord, Massachusetts to Charles K. Belknap Sr. He attended Yale University from 1898 to 1899, the United States Naval Academy from 1899 to 1903. He married Gladys Goodrich on October 26, 1909, in Pomfret, Connecticut.

Belknap was the commander of the destroyer USS Ammen (DD-35) in 1913 and attended the Naval War College from 1915 to 1916. He was promoted to the rank of lieutenant commander on August 29, 1916.

World War I

After the United States' declaration of war on Germany in April 1917, Belknap worked as a censor for the United States Navy.   Due to a shortage of experienced officers, he received a temporary promotion to commander on January 1, 1918.

On January 9, 1918, shortly after his promotion to commander, Belknap was appointed director of the newly formed Naval Overseas Transportation Service (NOTS).  In this position, Belknap was responsible for Navy cargo ships and all auxiliary vessels not assigned to the fleet or the various naval districts.

Later life
After the war's conclusion, Belknap resigned from the Navy on December 7, 1919.

He died on December 29, 1954, in St. Louis, Missouri. He was buried in the United States Naval Academy Cemetery.

Awards
In 1919 Belknap received the Navy Cross from the Navy and also the Distinguished Service Medal from the Army for his service with the Naval Overseas Transportation Service during World War I.  He was one of a very few individuals to receive both the Navy Cross and the Army Distinguished Service Medal.

He was also entitled to the Victory Medal.

References

External links

Charles Belknap, Jr. at Together We Served

}

Yale University alumni
Belknap Charles
Naval War College alumni
Burials at the United States Naval Academy Cemetery
1880 births
1954 deaths
People from Concord, Massachusetts
United States Navy officers
Military personnel from Massachusetts